Fursdon may refer to:

David Fursdon, English cricketer, Lord Lieutenant of Devon as of 2015
Major General Francis William Edward Fursdon - see 1980 New Year Honours
George Fursdon, High Sheriff of Devon in 1752
John Fursdon (died 1638), English Benedictine monk
John Fursdon (MP), Member of Parliament for Liskeard (UK Parliament constituency) in 1420
Phil Fursdon, singer in Racey

See also
Fursdon, Devon, a historic house and farming estate in Devon